The Battle of Nola may refer to the following engagements at Nola, Italy:

 Three battles of the Second Punic War in which Hannibal attacked defending Roman forces:
 The 1st Battle of Nola (216 BC)
 The 2nd Battle of Nola (215 BC)
 The 3rd Battle of Nola (214 BC)
The Battle of Nola (89 BC), a battle during the Social War between Romans under Sulla and rebels under Cluentius
The Battle of Nola (1460), at which John of Anjou defeated Ferdinand of Naples